Stefanie Rothweiler (born 28 July 1979, in Immenstadt) is a German former yacht racer who competed in the 2004 Summer Olympics and in the 2008 Summer Olympics.

References

1979 births
Living people
People from Immenstadt
Sportspeople from Swabia (Bavaria)
German female sailors (sport)
Olympic sailors of Germany
Sailors at the 2004 Summer Olympics – 470
Sailors at the 2008 Summer Olympics – 470